William Mullart was an Irish Anglican priest in the early Eighteenth century.

He was Dean of Cashel from 1706 until his death on 18 May 1713.

References

Deans of Cashel
1713 deaths